Westwoodhill is an area of the Scottish new town East Kilbride in South Lanarkshire.

Along with Murrayhill, it forms a boundary between Westwood and the Murray.

The eponymous Highway also connects these areas to Greenhills, Newlandsmuir and Mossneuk.

References 

Areas of East Kilbride